The Russian Liberation Army, also known as the Vlasov army after its commander Andrey Vlasov, was a collaborationist formation, primarily composed of Russians, that fought under German command during World War II.

Vlasov, a Soviet general, agreed to collaborate with Nazi Germany after having been captured on the Eastern Front. The soldiers under his command were mostly former Soviet prisoners of war but also included White Russian émigrés, some of whom were veterans of the anti-communist White Army from the Russian Civil War (1917–23). On 14 November 1944, it was officially renamed the Armed Forces of the Committee for the Liberation of the Peoples of Russia (KONR), with the KONR being formed as a political body to which the army pledged loyalty. On 28 January 1945, it was officially declared that the Russian divisions no longer form part of the German Army, but would directly be under the command of KONR.

In May 1945, members of the ROA switched sides and joined the anti-Nazi Prague uprising.

Origins
Russian volunteers who enlisted into the German Army (Wehrmacht Heer) wore the patch of the Russian Liberation Army. These volunteers (called Hiwi, a compression of Hilfswilliger, roughly meaning "volunteers") were not under any Russian command or control; they were exclusively under German command carrying out various non-combat duties. A number of them were employed at the Battle of Stalingrad, where it was estimated that as much as one quarter of the 6th Army's strength was USSR citizens. Soon, several German commanders began to use them in small armed units for various tasks, including combat against Soviet partisans, driving vehicles, carrying wounded, and delivering supplies.

Adolf Hitler allowed the idea of the Russian Liberation Army to circulate in propaganda literature, as long as no formations of the sort were actually permitted. As a result, some Red Army soldiers surrendered or defected in hopes of joining an army that did not exist. Many Soviet prisoners of war volunteered to serve under German command just to get out of Nazi POW camps, which were notorious for starving Soviet prisoners to death.

Meanwhile, the newly captured USSR general Vlasov, along with his German and Russian allies, was desperately lobbying the German high command, hoping that the green light would be given for the formation of a real armed force that would be exclusively under Russian control. They were able to win over Alfred Rosenberg to some extent.

Although Hitler's staff repeatedly refused to even consider the idea, Vlasov and his allies reasoned that Hitler would eventually come to realize the futility of a war against the USSR without winning over the Russian people, and respond to Vlasov's demands.

Irrespective of the political wrangling over Vlasov and the status of the ROA, by mid-1943 several hundred thousand ex-Soviet volunteers were serving in the German forces, either as Hiwis or in Eastern volunteer units (referred to as Osteinheiten ("Eastern units") or landeseigene Verbände). These latter were generally deployed in a security role at the rear of the armies and army groups in the East, where they constituted a major part of the German effort to counter the activity of Soviet partisan forces, dating as far back as early 1942. The Germans were, however, always concerned about their reliability.

Following the German defeats in the summer of 1943 the units began to disintegrate. On 12 September for example, 2nd Army had to withdraw Sturm-Btl. AOK 2 in order to deal with what was described as "several mutinies and desertions of Eastern units".  A 14 September communication from the army states that in the recent period, Hiwi absenteeism had risen considerably.  Following a series of attempted or successful mutinies, and a surge in desertions, the Germans decided in September 1943 that the reliability of the units had fallen to a level where they were more a liability than an asset. In an October 1943 report, the 8th Army concluded grimly: "All local volunteers are unreliable during enemy contact. Principal reason of unreliability is the employment of these volunteers in the East." Two days previously, the German army had given permission to the KTB to take harsh measures in the event of further cases of rebellion or unreliability, investing regimental commanders with far-reaching powers to hold summary courts and execute the verdicts.

Since it was felt that the reliability of Russian volunteers would improve if they were removed from contact with the local population, it was decided to send them to the Western Front, and the majority of them were re-deployed in late 1943 or early 1944.

Many of these battalions were integrated into the divisions in the West. A number of the Russian soldiers were on guard in Normandy on D-Day but, without the equipment or motivation to fight the Allies, most promptly surrendered.

A total of 71 "Eastern" battalions served on the Eastern Front, while 42 battalions served in Belgium, Finland, France, and Italy.

An aerial contingent of Russian volunteers was formed as Ostfliegerstaffel (russische) in December 1943, only to be disbanded in July 1944 before seeing combat. The Russian airmen were regrouped into the Night Harassment Squadron 8, whose first and only mission took place on 13 April 1945, when they attacked a Soviet bridgehead at Erlenhof, on the Oder River.

Formation

 

The ROA did not officially exist until autumn of 1944, after Heinrich Himmler persuaded a very reluctant Hitler to permit the formation of 10 Russian Liberation Army divisions.

On 14 November in Prague, Vlasov read aloud the Prague Manifesto before the newly created Committee for the Liberation of the Peoples of Russia. This document stated the purposes of the battle against Stalin, and spelled out 14 points which the army was fighting for. German insistence that the document carry anti-Semitic rhetoric was successfully parried by Vlasov's committee, but they  were obliged to include a statement criticising the Western Allies, labelling them "plutocracies" that were "allies of Stalin in his conquest of Europe".

By February 1945, only one division, the 1st Infantry (600th Infantry), was fully organised, under the command of General Sergei Bunyachenko. Formed at Münsingen, it fought briefly on the Oder Front before switching sides and helping the Czechs liberate Prague.

A second division, the 2nd Infantry (650th Infantry), was incomplete when it left Lager Heuberg but was sent into action under the command of General Mikhail Meandrov. This division was joined in large numbers by eastern workers, which caused it to nearly double in size as it marched south. A third, the 3rd Infantry (700th German Infantry), had only begun formation.

Several other Russian units, such as the Russian Corps, XVth SS Cossack Cavalry Corps of General Helmuth von Pannwitz, the Cossack Camp of Ataman Domanov, and other primarily White émigré formations, had agreed to become a part of Vlasov's army. However, their membership remained de jure as the turn of events did not permit Vlasov to use the troops in any operation (even reliable communications were often impossible).

A small group of ROA volunteers fought against the Red Army on 9 February 1945. Their fighting spirit earned them the praise of Heinrich Himmler. The only active combat the Russian Liberation Army undertook against the Red Army was by the Oder River on 11 April 1945, largely at the insistence of Himmler, as a test of the army's reliability. After three days, the outnumbered 1st Division had to retreat.

On 28 January 1945, it was officially declared that the Russian divisions no longer formed part of the German Army, but would be directly under the command of KONR.

Vlasov then ordered the first division to march south to concentrate all Russian anti-communist forces loyal to him. As an army, he reasoned, they could all surrender to the Allies on "favorable" terms, which particularly meant no repatriation to the Soviet Union. Vlasov sent several secret delegations to the Allies to begin negotiating a surrender, hoping they would sympathise with the goals of ROA and potentially use it in an inevitable future war with the USSR.

Fight against the Germans in Prague

During the march south, the first division of the ROA came to the help of the Czech partisans in the Prague uprising against the German occupation, which started on 5 May 1945. Vlasov was initially reluctant to agree to that move, but ultimately did not resist General Bunyachenko's decision to fight against the Germans.

The first division engaged in battle with Waffen-SS units that had been sent to level the city. The ROA units, armed with heavy weaponry, fended off the relentless SS assault, and together with the Czech insurgents succeeded in preserving most of Prague from destruction and liberate Prague.

When the Red Army finally reached the Czech capital, the city was essentially free of German troops. "The Red Army appear in Prague only once the war had ended, de jure and de facto."

Due to the predominance of communists in the new Czech Rada ("council"), the first division had to leave the city. They tried to surrender to US Third Army of General Patton. The Allies, however, gave in to the political pressures. Approximately 33,000 men were handed over between May and September 1945 to USSR forces. They were then executed or sent to the Gulag.

Capture by the Soviets
Thousands of soldiers were initially taken into Allied custody by the 44th Infantry Division and other U.S. troops. In a move that Allied command kept secret for many years, they were then forcibly handed over to the Soviets by the Allies, due to a previous agreement between Churchill and Stalin that all ROA soldiers would be returned to the USSR. Some Allied officers who were sympathetic to the ROA soldiers permitted them to escape in small groups into the American-controlled zones.

The Soviet government labelled all ROA soldiers (vlasovtsy, "vlasovites") as traitors, and those who were repatriated were tried and sentenced to detention in prison and forced labour camps in Russia as for instance in Mongolia.

Vlasov and several other leaders of the ROA were tried and hanged in Moscow on 1 August 1946.

Order of battle 
The composition of the VS-KONR was as follows:

Air elements
I. Ostfliegerstaffel (russische) (1st Eastern Squadron-Russian) (1943–1944)
II. Störkampfstaffel (Night Harassment Squadron) 8 (1945)
KONR Air Force

Ranks

See also 

 First Russian National Army
 Ukrainian Liberation Army
 Ukrainian National Army
 Ostlegionen (mainly units of peoples from the Caucasus)
 Russian Liberation Movement
 Kaminski Brigade
 Operation Keelhaul
 Russian Corps
 Russian All National Popular State Movement
 Collaboration during World War II
 Russian Monument (Liechtenstein)
 Wehrmacht foreign volunteers and conscripts
 Russian Volunteer Corps

Notes

References

Sources 
 Elizabeth M.F. Grasmeder, "Leaning on Legionnaires: Why Modern States Recruit Foreign Soldiers," International Security (July 2021), Vol 46 (No. 1), pp. 147–195.
The Gulag Archipelago: 1918-1956 by Aleksandr I. Solzhenitsyn
Army of the Damned: on Twentieth Century – CBS Documentary Documentary Series, December 1962
Fersen, Nicholas. Corridor of Honour. Bobbs-Merrill, Indianapolis 1958.

External links 
Articles
 Elizabeth M.F. Grasmeder, "Leaning on Legionnaires: Why Modern States Recruit Foreign Soldiers," International Security (July 2021), Vol 46 (No. 1), pp. 147–195.
 It's Too Early To Forgive Vlasov, The St. Petersburg Times, 6 November 2001  	
Other
 Russian Liberation Army information page by veteran Alexander Dubov
 Russian Volunteers in the German Wehrmacht in World War II by Lt. Gen Wladyslaw Anders and Antonio Munoz
 Russian Liberation Army, rare footage (video)

Foreign volunteer units of the Wehrmacht
 
 
Military units and formations established in 1944
Military units and formations disestablished in 1945
Anti-communist organizations in Russia